The Oterei River (officially Ōterei River) is a river of the southern Wairarapa, in the Wellington Region of New Zealand's North Island.

In December 2019, the approved official geographic name of the river was gazetted as "Ōterei River".

See also
List of rivers of New Zealand

References

Rivers of the Wellington Region
Rivers of New Zealand